James David Manning (born February 20, 1947) is an American pastor at the ATLAH World Missionary Church. Manning grew up in Red Springs, North Carolina, and has been with ATLAH since 1981. ATLAH stands for All The Land Anointed Holy, which is Manning's name for Harlem.

Biography
James David Manning was born on February 20, 1947, in Red Springs, North Carolina. He grew up in the town, which was then segregated. He picked cotton and pulled tobacco as a child, then took a bus to New York the day he graduated from high school. He worked as a marketing representative for Procter & Gamble. He became radicalized in the 1960s and said he was driven by his hatred of white people. As a younger man, Manning burglarized homes, mostly on Long Island. Between 1969 and 1974, he said, he broke into as many as 100 houses and once threatened an associate with a loaded shotgun. He spent about  years in prison in New York and Florida for burglary, robbery, larceny, criminal possession of a weapon, and other charges before his release in 1978. While in prison, he became a devout Christian.

He became pastor at Bethelite Missionary Baptist Church several years after prison. After beginning study in 1982, Manning graduated from Union Theological Seminary in the City of New York where he was awarded a Master of Divinity in 1985. In 1991, he changed his church's name to ATLAH, an acronym for “All the Land Anointed Holy”.

Taxation controversies

New York City authorities claim that ATLAH owes $1.02 million in unpaid taxes and unpaid water bills. In 2016 the church was due to be sold at a public auction, and The Ali Forney Center, a nonprofit organization providing transitional homes for homeless LGBT youth raised money to purchase it, reaching its target of $200,000 to buy the church. In September 2016, a judge vacated the foreclosure and sale order, ruling the property cannot be forced to be sold until such time that ATLAH is found to actually owe the taxes the city claims it owes. After the court ruling, Manning threatened to publicly burn the rainbow flag as a celebration, which caused the Ali Forney Center to organize a protest outside of the church. The case remains in the courts as of 2022.

Views

Criticism of homosexuality 
Manning has received some media coverage for his condemnations of homosexuality, which include calling for homosexuals to be stoned to death. Manning's views on homosexuality include the beliefs that "white homos are going to take the black woman's man".  He calls for Harlem to be a "homo-free zone."

In an interview with The Huffington Post, Manning stated, "The homosexual activists are flat-out lying about what Jesus would do regarding the detestable, abominable, diseased practice and act of homosexuality. They have been lying and saying that Jesus would simply love." Manning has stated that Starbucks will be "ground zero for spreading Ebola" in the United States because homosexuals frequent the stores and "a lot of bodily fluids" are exchanged. Manning has also stated that Starbucks puts semen in its coffees, and that millions of people around the world "really think that the taste of semen is quite a flavor."

Criticism of Barack Obama 

Manning came to public attention during the 2008 presidential election after ATLAH posted several sermons of his on YouTube that were harshly critical of Obama. Among other accusations, he called Obama's mother "white trash" for becoming pregnant by a black man out of wedlock, an issue he discussed during a press conference at the National Press Club on December 8, 2008.

It is common knowledge that African men, coming from the continent of Africa — especially for the first time — do diligently seek out white women to have sexual intercourse with. Generally the most noble of white society choose not to intercourse sexually with these men. So it's usually the trashier ones who make their determinations that they're going to have sex.

Manning defended his sermons in an interview on Fox News, saying that "we also have to talk about his character." The sermons drew the attention of Americans United for Separation of Church and State, which filed a complaint with the Internal Revenue Service objecting to alleged violations of laws granting tax-free status to churches on the condition that they refrain from certain forms of political activity.

Manning continued his criticisms of Obama after his election, frequently calling him a criminal and "long-legged mack daddy." He produced a video in summer 2009 in which he predicted that there would be a white backlash against Obama, complete with riots, and he attended one of the first "birther" events. In an interview with the Israeli radio station Arutz Sheva, Manning asserted that Obama had chosen to befriend Muslims instead of Jews; he also offered praise of Meir Kahane.

In May 2010 Manning staged a show trial of Barack Obama at ATLAH for wire fraud, with Manning acting as prosecutor. Although the treason and sedition charges had been deleted from consideration at the trial, Manning expressed the opinion that Obama should be hanged.

On August 4, 2014, he prognosticated that Obama and Vladimir Putin would be outed as gay within 100 days.

Criticism of black leadership 
In his sermons and in video messages posted on his church's website and on YouTube, Manning has denounced the influence of Charles Rangel, Al Sharpton, Cornel West and Jay-Z. He has also had harsh words for black people in general, and black men in particular.

Opposition to gentrification in Harlem 
Manning is fiercely opposed to the gentrification of Harlem and calls for its residents to boycott its shops, restaurants, doctors, banks and churches. That action, combined with a general rent strike, would force all property owners out of Harlem, he said, leaving the neighborhood to its rightful inheritors: black people. Manning said the intent of the boycott was to return Harlem to its pre-gentrification days of 1990, without the crack cocaine, crime, and boarded-up buildings. His hope, he says, is that declining property values will make housing affordable for black people.

Manning calls his plan "No Dew, Nor Rain", after Elijah's warning to Ahab, king of Israel, of a coming drought. "When there's no dew, no rain, there's a drought — there's all kinds of suffering", Manning said. The whole of Harlem, he said, is to be a "drought zone".

References

External links
 Website of ATLAH World Missionary Church

1947 births
Living people
American Christian clergy
American conspiracy theorists
American evangelists
American Internet celebrities
American Kahanists
American people convicted of burglary
Christian conspiracy theorists
American Christian Zionists
Discrimination against LGBT people in the United States
People from Red Springs, North Carolina
Politics and race in the United States
Union Theological Seminary (New York City) alumni